Sehsuechte (German: Sehsüchte; neologism generated of the words Sehnsucht (eng: longing) and sehen (eng: to view, to see)) is an international student film festival with an over 60 years lasting tradition. It takes place annually in spring in Potsdam-Babelsberg, Germany.

History 
From 1972 on, the so-called FDJ Student Film Days of the University for Film and Television Konrad Wolf (known as HFF) were held on the DEFA-campus  in Potsdam-Babelsberg. However, in the course of Germany's reunification the FDJ Student Film Days were ended temporarily. After this short interruption, students of the study program Audiovisual Media Sciences revived the film fest in 1995 under the name Sehsüchte. Today the students of the master program Media Sciences are in charge of the festival's organization and are supported by the bachelor students of the program Digital Media Culture.

Festival 
Annually, about 120 short and feature films in the categories fiction, documentary, genre, animation as well as music videos and youth films are screened. The program always comprises films from Europe and the whole world. In 2016, the program included projects from 28 countries, such as Russia, Israel, India and China. A jury, consisting of prominent filmmakers and film experts, ultimately rewards the best oeuvres.

The organizers’ aim is to provide a platform to young international filmmakers and to enhance the exchange of ideas among themselves, with media and film professionals as well as with the broader audience. Especially the latter emphasizes that Sehsüchte always seeks to be a public event. Annually, about 8.000 film-enthusiasts, qualified visitors and journalists attend the several days lasting festival, which takes place in next to the famous Studio Babelsberg, Europe's oldest and biggest film studio.

Competition 
The international competition is divided into the sections Feature Film, Short Film, Documentary Film, Genre Film, Music Video, Spotlight Production, Future: Kids and Future: Teens. Live action and animation are treated equally.

The jury principally does not evaluate the films according to predefined criteria. However, esthetics, narration and originality loom large. One exception is the section Spotlight Production. Here the management and financial planning of the film's production are evaluated.

While in all competition sections an expert jury (in the case of Future: Kids and Future:Teens a children and youth jury) elects the winner, the music video award 2017 will be bestowed as an audience award.

Schreibsüchte is, in contrast to the remaining competition categories, a solely germanophone competition. Here the work of authors and project developers in the categories Screenplay and Pitch is appreciated and in both cases the most promising project awarded. Writing skills, dramatic composition and ingenuity are pivotal while feasibility  remains secondary.

In the past, additionally those awards were bestowed:
 Award Against Exclusion (2003 - 2005, 2008 - 2010)
 Innovation Award (2003 - 2005)
 Editing Award (2003 - 2005, 2008 - 2015)
 Cinematography Award (2005, 2008 - 2010, 2012, 2013)
 German Junior Award (2005, 2008, 2009)
 Actor's Award (2008, 2010 - 2012, 2014, 2015)
 Focus-Dialog Award (2008 - 2010, 2012, 2013)
 Start-Up Award (2010)
 Sound Award (2015)

Focus 
Every year, the Sehsüchte Focus announces a geographical or socio-cultural topic that takes the center stage of the festival and thus invites to discover it in new and different manners. 2003 was overshadowed by 9/11 related topics. With a view to the Chinese Cinema 2005 the Focus series was established in the festival program. Under the Motto “Sehsüchte in Gold Fever” the student festival 2006 devoted itself to Russian Cinema. 2009 then, the view was directed to the Indian subcontinent, 2010 South Africa was in the focus, 2011 the Turkey. In 2012, for the first time, Sehsüchte Focus did not pivot on a specific region anymore but with “Sustainability” on a concept. In the year of 2013, the students put “Excess” in the center and during the Sehsüchte Festival 2014 everything turned to “Transit”. With the focus theme “Echo” in 2014 Sehsüchte bethought itself in its function as an audience festival and enhanced the exchange between filmmakers and their public. 2016 the motto „S.P.A.C.E.“ was elected and fitting to this the new competition category “Genre Film” was established. The overall topic of 2017's festival program will be called “surfaces”.

Retrospective 
When the HFF celebrated its 50-year existence in 2004, the Retrospective was established as a look back on the student films which were produced during this half a century. In 2009 the Retrospective succeeded in establishing itself through a monographic show of Andreas Dresen in the light of the fall of the Berlin Wall. In 2010 this historical screening series was devoted to Hans-Christian Schmid’s oeuvre. 2011 Sehsüchte showed several films of Wim Wenders, among others his work Pina in 3D, while in 2012 the Retrospective was attended to two filmmakers who could not be more different: the German director, writer and producer Doris Dörrie and the German splatter specialist, author and film critic Jörg Buttgereit. In 2013 the Retrospective was rethought and complemented with a playful Futurospective. Here, for the first time it was not anymore the monographic show of one single artist which was in the focus. Instead, everything turned on the question how filmmakers in the past and the present developed and enhanced innovative forms of film-making.

During the years 2015 and 2016, the Retrospective disappeared in the festival’s program before now in 2017 it will be revived. The motivation for this was the Media Science’s students’ wish to strengthen the integration of their fellow students in the festival's organization. So in 2017, the Retrospective for the first time will be curated autonomously by students of the Master program Film Culture Heritage.

Jurors 
The winner's films in the several competition categories are elected by expert juries respectively. Each year, those juries are recomposed with experienced filmmakers and experts of the media industry.

Selection (since 2001)

Critics and awards 
On the 17th of November 2010 Sehsüchte was awarded with the Potsdam Congress Award in the category “Periodic Event”. This award, including a prize money of 1.000 Euros acknowledges event organizers in the areas science, research, economy and culture who render outstanding services in realizing congresses and conferences in Potsdam as an ambassador of the provincial capital.

External links 
 www.sehsuechte.de − Sehsüchte's official website 
 www.filmuniversitaet.de − official website of the Film University Babelsberg Konrad Wolf 
 www.facebook.com/sehsuechte − Sehsüchte on Facebook
 www.twitter.com/sehsuechte − Sehsüchte on Twitter
 www.filmfreeway.com/sehsuechte − international submission platform for film festivals

Film festivals in Germany
Recurring events established in 1972
Potsdam